Václav Cílek (born 11 May 1955) is Czech geologist, climatologist, writer, philosopher, science popularizer and translator of Tao and Zen texts.

Biography 
In his youth, Cílek moved to Tanzania, where his father worked as a geologist. From 1969 to 1970, he studied at a high school in Tanzania. Later he continued his studies at the Mining Technical School in Příbram (1970–1974). In 1979 he graduated in geology from the Charles University in Prague. Since 1980, he works in Geologic Institute of Czech Academy of Sciences and specializes on geology of Cenozoic Era. He also explores interactions between environment and civilization. Between 2004 and 2012, he was the director of the Geologic Institute of Czech Academy of Science.

Cílek also published several popularization books and many articles in journals and newspapers. During his career, he collaborated with Hospodářské noviny, Lidové noviny, Mladá fronta DNES, Mladý svět, Právo, Reflex, Respekt, Czech Television, Czech Radio etc. He was a co-creator of the TV series about caves of the Czech Republic, called Podzemní Čechy (The Underground Czech Republic, 2001).

In 2004, Cílek was awarded Tom Stoppard Prize for his books Krajiny vnitřní a vnější (2002) and Makom: Kniha míst (2004). Additionally, he was named Laureate by the Minister of Ecology for "valuable contribution to the popularization of Czech science, especially geology and climatology" (2007). In 2009, he was awarded the  Václav Havel Foundation VIZE 97 Prize.

Works 
 1985: Heavy Mineral Accumulations in Coastal Mozambique
 1995: Podzemní Praha: Soupis podzemních objektů hlavního města a vybraná bibliografie, 
 1997: Píseň pro odcházející duši
 2002: Krajiny vnitřní a vnější: texty o paměti krajiny, smysluplném bobrovi, areálu jablkového štrůdlu a také o tom, proč lezeme na rozhlednu, 
 2003: Střední Čechy: příroda, člověk, krajina,  (coauthored by Vojen Ložek and Jarmila Kubíková)
 2003: Velká kniha o klimatu Zemí koruny české,  Jiří Svoboda, Zdeněk Vašků; (coauthored)
 2004: Makom: kniha míst, 
 2004: Vstoupit do krajiny. O přírodě a paměti středních Čech,  (coauthored by Vojen Ložek and Pavel Mudra)
 2004: Prague Between History and Dreams. US: Xlibris. 
 2005: Tichý břeh světa. . (photography by Hana Rysová)
 2005: Střední Brdy , (ed.)
 2006: Tsunami je stále s námi: eseje o klimatu, společnosti a katastrofách, 
 2007: Nejistý plamen: Průvodce ropným světem. . (coauthored by Martin Kašík)
 2007: Borgesův svět. 
 2008: Dýchat s ptáky: Obyčejné texty o světle paměti, pravdě oblaků a útěše míst 
 2008: Podzemní Praha: Jeskyně, doly, štoly, krypty a podzemní pískovny velké Prahy, . (photography by Milan Korba and Martin Majer)
 2009: Orfeus: Kniha podzemních řek, 
 2009: Krajina z druhé strany, .
 2010: Jak to vidí Václav Cílek,  (interviews on Czech Radio)
 2010: Archeus: Fragment radostné vědy o trpaslících 
 2011: Krásná paní: Kameny domova,
 2012: Prohlédni si tu zemi,

Notes

External links
 Short biography 

1955 births
Living people
Czech geologists
Czech male writers
Scientists from Brno
Charles University alumni